The Church of All Nations, formerly known as the Wesleyan Methodist Church, first held religious services on Sunday 6 March 1870. Located on 180 Palmerston Street, Carlton in Melbourne, Australia, the bluestone-covered church was designed by English architect Joseph Reed of Reed & Barnes. Mr Johns Pidgon was contracted to build the Romanesque building after the church received a loan of £300 for its construction when the previous (Stucco) brick chapel beside it became too small for the growing congregation.

History

After designing almost every major church building in Carlton (including St Jude's, the Congregational Church and the Church of the Sacred Heart), Joseph Reed's Gothic design suffered two setbacks. The first design announcement in 1857 was communally opposed, and the Wesleyan Church Architecture article guide published by the Wesleyan Chronicle changed the style and forms of the building from a Roman Gothic pageantry to a more Romanesque Norman architectural language.

Due to funding issues, the central area of the church was shortened, and neither the grand spire nor the surrounding balconies were constructed. The building still stands as an important and significant piece of Australian architecture, representing a fine example of the Norman Romanesque style in the state of Victoria.

Description

The Church of All Nations building is covered in a dominant bluestone with freestone dressings. The exterior features many architectural languages. From the front elevation, the observer is confronted with three Romanesque arches which shelter the porch and a tower on the right hand side. The designs of the small circular windows and semi-circular arches are repeated around the building.

In detail, the front section reveals signs of having been added after the original construction. The side windows that were the two original entrances in 1870 now appear to have been pushed back from the face of the stonework and the corners are beveled.
Internally, the building has a gallery at the rear of the building. The original plan featured galleries on both sides, but they proved too hot during the summer. The rear gallery was used for the multilingual translation booths from the 1960s, and is now used for office space. Directly opposite, the timber pulpit (with stairs leading up either from either side) is located under the tall ceiling, a technique to obtain good acoustics. The acoustics were exploited by the Fincham Organ, built by George Fincham in 1877 which was donated to the church by the younger members of the congregation. The organ is located on the north east side of the church.

The pews allow for maximum attendance yet allow a comfortable kneeling space, a six square feet for an average adult.

References

External links
Church of All Nations website

Churches completed in 1870
Uniting churches in Melbourne
1870 establishments in Australia
Romanesque Revival church buildings in Australia
Buildings and structures in the City of Melbourne (LGA)